Sylvan Lake Park, previously Sylvan Lake Provincial Park, is an urban park in the Town of Sylvan Lake on the southern shore of Sylvan Lake in central Alberta, Canada. Prior to early 2018, it existed a provincial park for 38 years until its ownership was transferred to the Town of Sylvan Lake. The park averages 761,223 visitors every July and August.

History 
The park was originally designated a provincial park in 1932 but was transferred to the Town of Sylvan Lake in the 1960s. It was redesignated a provincial park on January 16, 1980. Its designation was rescinded on January 17, 2018. The Town renamed the park as Sylvan Lake Park after the transfer.

See also 
List of Alberta provincial parks
List of Canadian provincial parks
List of National Parks of Canada
Urban parks in Canada

References

External links 
Decision to Disestablish Sylvan Lake Provincial Park and Transfer the Land to the Town of Sylvan Lake

Parks in Alberta
Red Deer County
Urban public parks in Canada